Rank comparison chart of naval forces of Commonwealth of Nations states.

Most of the 52 Commonwealth nations have their beginnings in British Empire and have shared naval traditions. By comparison, Gabon and Togo are French colonies, Mozambique is a former Portuguese colony while Rwanda is a German and later, Belgian colony. Even after some had achieved a degree of independent government from the UK, their naval protection was still British; the Royal New Zealand Navy did not exist separately until 1941.

Officers

See also 
 Comparative navy officer ranks of the Americas
 Ranks and insignia of NATO navies' officers

Notes

References 

 
Military comparisons